Docessissophothrips is a genus of thrips in the family Phlaeothripidae.

Species
 Docessissophothrips ampliceps
 Docessissophothrips bonfilsi
 Docessissophothrips brasiliensis
 Docessissophothrips corticis
 Docessissophothrips cuneatus
 Docessissophothrips dotatus
 Docessissophothrips major
 Docessissophothrips rufescens
 Docessissophothrips tenuiceps
 Docessissophothrips tibialis
 Docessissophothrips travassosi
 Docessissophothrips villicornis
 Docessissophothrips woytkowskyi
 Docessissophothrips yupanqui

References

Phlaeothripidae
Thrips
Thrips genera